Edward William Zeniuk  (March 8, 1933 – April 14, 1996) was a Canadian professional ice hockey defenceman who played in two games in the National Hockey League Detroit Red Wings during the 1954–55 season. He was born in Landis, Saskatchewan.

Professional career
Zeniuk started play with the Edmonton Poolers of the Edmonton Junior Hockey League in 1950. He showed promise and was brought up to spend the following two seasons with the Edmonton Oil Kings of the Western Canada Junior Hockey League. Known more for his defensive play, he still managed to score five goals and finish his first season with 21 points. He continued his strong play the following season and was called up to the WHL. He played one season with both the Edmonton Flyers and the Seattle Bombers.

Filling in for injury, Zeniuk was finally promoted to the NHL in the 1954–55 season. He failed to record a point in two games and was sent back down to the minors. The Detroit Red Wings would go on to win the Stanley Cup that year.

Zeniuk continued play with the Edmonton Flyers where he spent the remainder of the 1954–55 season. For the 1955–56 season, Zedniuk began play with the New Westminster Royals before ending his season and career as a member of the Quebec Aces of the Quebec Hockey League.

Career statistics

Regular season and playoffs

External links
 

1933 births
1996 deaths
Canadian ice hockey defencemen
Detroit Red Wings players
Edmonton Flyers (WHL) players
Edmonton Oil Kings (WCHL) players
Ice hockey people from Saskatchewan
New Westminster Royals (WHL) players
Quebec Aces (QSHL) players
Seattle Bombers players